Africa Week was a weekly magazine that covers African affairs.

History and profile
Africa Week was established by TransAfrica Publishing Ltd in May 2004.

The magazines was the successor of West Africa, another weekly magazine. Africa Week was published by TransAfrica Publishing Ltd and was based in London. Frank Afful is the founding managing editor and Desmond Davies the founding editor of the magazine. The now defunct magazine covers news on the politics, social issues and economics of Africa.

References

External links
 

2004 establishments in the United Kingdom
Defunct political magazines published in the United Kingdom
Magazines established in 2004
Magazines published in London
Weekly magazines published in the United Kingdom
Magazines with year of disestablishment missing